Alexandria Aerodrome  is located in Alexandria, Ontario, Canada, near the Ontario/Quebec border and the edge of Montreal terminal airspace. This airport's primary uses are for gliders and skydiving.

See also
 List of airports in the Montreal area

References

Registered aerodromes in Ontario